Qitul or Kuitul or Qaitol or Qeytul or Qeytur may refer to:

Qeytul, Gilan-e Gharb, Kermanshah Province
Qeytul, Harsin, Kermanshah Province
Qitul, Qazvin
Qeytul, Zanjan
Qeytur, Zanjan